The Legend of Frosty the Snowman is a 2005 direct-to-video animated film produced by Classic Media, Studio B Productions, and Top Draw Animation.

The film is narrated by Burt Reynolds and features Bill Fagerbakke as the voice of Frosty the Snowman and voice actress Kath Soucie as Tommy Tinkerton, with background music composed by Jared Faber. It is the fifth and last television special to feature Frosty to date.

Plot
Frosty the Snowman travels to the town of Evergreen, which is seemingly idyllic but full of unhappy children who must follow harsh rules. Frosty tries to play with Mayor Tinkerton's son Tommy, but he is afraid of displeasing his uptight father, who keeps the family and the town on a strict schedule and favors Tommy's devoted older brother Charlie. Seeing he cannot reach Tommy yet, Frosty finds Tommy's best friend and neighbor, a nervous boy named Walter Wader, and convinces him to play in the snow with him one night. Walter has so much fun that he walks into school confidently the next day.

Word spreads about Walter breaking curfew and having fun, prompting the school's principal Hank Pankley to complain to Mr. Tinkerton. Walter and Charlie get into a food fight at lunch period and are immediately placed in detention. Tinkerton takes a pin marked "#1" from Charlie and interrogates Walter, who replies that he was "playing with a magical snowman", causing Tinkerton to react nervously. Pankley assures Tinkerton that Walter's story is not true, secretly desiring to take Tinkerton's job as mayor.

As school ends, Charlie mocks Walter for believing in Frosty, but Frosty arrives outside the school and the two join him. Tommy leaves to follow Sara Simple, a schoolmate he has a crush on, but instead Frosty's hat leads him to the library, where he discovers a comic book about Frosty. The comic tells of a boy whose father is a stage magician (Professor Hinkle) who denounces magic, yet the boy brings Frosty to life using his father's hat. Tommy reads that the boy spends the rest of winter looking for Frosty, but the rest of the comic's pages are blank.

An increasingly disturbed Tinkerton finds Tommy and gives him the "#1" pin, confessing that Charlie and the other children have told him the same story about a magic snowman and wanting Tommy to tell him if anything else strange happens. Tommy wears the pin to school but is ignored for being Tinkerton's new favorite. Tommy discovers his mother scrapbooking old photos of his father, revealing that the boy in the comic is Tinkerton.

Frosty continues to play with the children, including Sara, until they begin disobeying rules, appalling their parents and causing Tinkerton to break down. Pankley convinces Tinkerton to make him mayor at the next town meeting, promising to restore order. He also notices Walter feeling left out of playing with Frosty and tricks him into helping him lay a trap for Frosty. Walter goes ice skating with Frosty on a frozen pond until Frosty falls through the ice and melts, allowing Pankley to steal the hat.

As Tommy attempts to read the comic, the blank pages restore themselves. Pankley is revealed to have stolen the hat and locked it away the same winter Tinkerton was looking for Frosty, warning that Pankley will take over Evergreen completely if he is allowed to succeed. Tommy regains the trust of his friends when he shows them the complete comic, and they successfully retrieve the hat from the school and revive Frosty.

The adults notice their children's absences and head into the woods to find them dancing with Frosty despite Pankley's attempts to stop them. Tommy returns the "#1" pin to Tinkerton, accepting his apology to disobey him, but Tinkerton assures his son he did the right thing and happily recognizes Frosty and his father's hat. Tinkerton reinstates himself as mayor after he realizes Pankley's treachery and Walter hits him with a snowball, leading Frosty to involve the other adults in a snowball fight.

The adults reconcile with their children and Tinkerton comes to believe in magic again, not wanting his sons to grow up without magic as he did. He also removes the rules and curfews from the town. The film's narrator is revealed to be an elderly Tommy who now lives together with Sara, hearing her call him home from the cold.

Cast
 Burt Reynolds as Narrator, Old Tommy
 Bill Fagerbakke as Frosty the Snowman
 Kath Soucie as Tommy Tinkerton, Old Sara
 Tom Kenny as Mr. Tinkerton
 Larry Miller as Principal Pankley
 Jeannie Elias as Charlie Tinkerton, Librarian
 Kenny Blank as Walter Wader
 Tara Strong as Sara Simple, Sonny Sklarew
 Grey DeLisle as Miss Sharpey, Simon Sklarew, Sullivan Sklarew
 Candi Milo as Mrs. Tinkerton, Girl #2
 David Jeremiah as Mr. Simple, Mr. Sklarew, Townsperson #1
 Tress MacNeille as Mrs. Simple, Girl #1
 Vernee Watson-Johnson as Mrs. Wader
 Evan Gore as Paperboy

Background
The film holds only a loose continuity with Rankin/Bass's 1969 television adaptation of Steve Nelson and Jack Rollins's 1950 Christmas song, "Frosty the Snowman", although Frosty's design by Paul Coker, Jr. is identical and Tommy's grandfather is clearly Professor Hinkle, the reformed antagonist of the original special. Although Santa Claus is mentioned, there is no direct reference to Christmas itself. Even so, this special has more in common with the original than the previous sequel in 1992, the Lorne Michaels-Bill Melendez collaboration Frosty Returns. The film was produced in late 2004, but like Rudolph's Shiny New Year, it was not released until a full year later.

The film originally aired annually on Cartoon Network from 2005 until December 11, 2011, when the special moved to Kids & Teens TV, which ceased operations in 2019. Following this, the special was acquired by AMC as part of their Best Christmas Ever event. Distribution rights to the film are currently held by NBCUniversal Television Distribution  following its parent Comcast's acquisition of DreamWorks Animation, which acquired the film's holder Classic Media in 2012. DreamWorks released the special for free on YouTube on November 30, 2017, along with the original Frosty the Snowman.

References

Notes

External links

2005 films
2005 animated films
2000s American television specials
2000s animated television specials
American Christmas films
American children's animated fantasy films
Canadian animated fantasy films
Animated Christmas films
Canadian Christmas films
Canadian fantasy films
Frosty the Snowman television specials
DHX Media films
2000s Christmas films
Films set in the 1970s
Philippine children's films
Philippine Christmas films
Philippine animated films
Animated direct-to-video specials
Canadian direct-to-video films
2000s children's animated films
2000s American films
2000s Canadian films